Avici may refer to:

 Avīci or Avichi, the lowest level of Hell in Buddhism
 Avici a 21 November 2015 (season 6) episode of Drama Special
 Avīci (01), a 2017 extended play by Avicii

See also
 Avicii (born Tim Bergling; 1989–2018), a Swedish electronic music artist
 Avicii: True Stories, a 2017 biographical documentary film about the artist